Lathika is a 2011 film directed by R. Bharathan and Srinivasan starring Srinivasan and Meenakshi Kailash in the lead roles and Rahman in a pivotal role. The film marked the lead film debut of Srinivasan, who also produced the film. The film gave Srinivasan the sobriquet "Powerstar".

Cast 
 Srinivasan as Eashwar
 Meenakshi Kailash
 Rahman as Antony
 Shanmuga Sundaram
 Pooja
 Sahan Fathima
 Avanthi
 N. Ramanathan
 Baby Lathika

Production 
Dr. Srinivasan began production on a film starring himself in the lead role. He named the film Lathika after his daughter. Srinivasan rechristened himself as Powerstar Srinivasan in the film.

Controversy 
Through his financial company, Baba Trading Company, Srinivasan obtained Rs. 7 crore rupees from unsuspecting businessmen and used the money to begin a career in films through this film.

Srinivasan reportedly hired force fans to attend the movie at a single cinema in North Chennai for publicity sake. The film ran for over 200 days at a single theatre.

Reception 
A critic from Dinamalar wrote that Ra. Bharathan could have put more focus into the story, screenplay, dialogues, songs and music.

Sequel 
In 2015, Srinivasan expressed interest in creating a sequel to the film titled Lathika 2.

References

External links 
 

2011 films
2010s Tamil-language films
2011 masala films